Saint-Nabord station (French: Gare de Saint-Nabord) is a railway station serving the commune of Saint-Nabord, Vosges department, France. The station is owned and operated by SNCF.

Services 
The station is served by TER Grand Est trains between Nancy and Remiremont (line L04) operated by the SNCF.

Outside of a small passenger waiting area, the station lacks any additional passenger amenities.

See also 

 List of SNCF stations in Grand Est

References 

Railway stations in Vosges (department)
Railway stations in France opened in 1864